(Algerian Arabic: قاوس),. In 2008, the population was 26,137.
Kaous is a commune of Jijel Province.

References

External links

  Jijel news

Communes of Jijel Province